Robert McRuer (born 1966) is an American theorist who has contributed to fields in transnational queer and disability studies. McRuer is known as being one of the founding scholars involved in forming the field of queer disability studies, particularly for a theoretical outlook known as crip theory. He is currently professor of English at The George Washington University in Washington, DC.

McRuer received his PhD from the University of Illinois in 1995, advised by Michael Bérubé. His books include The Queer Renaissance: Contemporary American Literature and the Reinvention of Lesbian and Gay Identities and Crip Theory: Cultural Signs of Queerness and Disability. McRuer has also edited Sex and Disability, with Anna Mollow, and Desiring Disability: Queer Theory Meets Disability Studies, with Abby L. Wilkerson.

McRuer’s work focuses on queer and crip cultural studies and critical theory. In 2018, NYU Press published McRuer's Crip Times: Essays on Disability, Sexuality, and Neoliberalism, a work considering locations of disability within contemporary political economies and the roles that disabled movements and representations play in countering hegemonic forms of globalization. His first book centered on contemporary LGBT writers, particularly LGBT writers of color, and his 2018 book attends to cultural sites where critical queerness and disability contest heteronormativity and compulsory able-bodiedness.

List of publications
This is a partial list of publications by Robert McRuer:
 “A Visitation of Difference: Randall Kenan and Black Queer Theory”. (1993) Journal of Homosexuality, 26.2-3: 221-232.
 “Boys' Own Stories and New Spellings of My Name: Coming Out and Other Myths of Queer Positionality”. (1994) Genders, 260-260.
 The Queer Renaissance: Contemporary American Literature and the Reinvention of Lesbian and Gay Identities. (1997) New York University Press..
 “Critical Investments: AIDS, Christopher Reeve, and Queer/Disability Studies”. (2002) Journal of Medical Humanities, 23.3-4: 221-237.
 Desiring Disability: Queer Theory Meets Disability Studies. (2003, co-edited with Ellen Samuels) Special issue of GLQ: A Journal of Lesbian and Gay Studies, 9.1/2.
  “As Good as it Gets: Queer Theory and Critical Disability”. (2003) GLQ: A Journal of Lesbian and Gay Studies  9.1-2: 79-105. PDF.
 “Composing Bodies; or, De-Composition: Queer Theory, Disability Studies, and Alternative Corporealities”. (2004) JAC, 24.1: 47-78.  PDF.
 “Crip Eye for the Normate Guy: Queer Theory and the Disciplining of Disability Studies”. (2005) PMLA, 120.2: 586-592.
 “Compulsory Able-Bodiedness and Queer/Disabled Existence”. (2006) In Lennard J. Davis, ed. The Disability Studies Reader. 2nd ed. Routledge. 88-99. PDF.
 Crip Theory: Cultural Signs of Queerness and Disability. (2006) Foreword by Michael Bérubé. New York University Press..
 “We Were Never Identified: Feminism, Queer Theory, and a Disabled World”. (2006) Radical History Review, 94: 148-154.
 “Taking It to the Bank: Independence and Inclusion on the World Market”. (2007) Journal of Literary & Cultural Disability Studies, 1.2: 5-14. PDF.
 “Disability Nationalism in Crip Times”. (2010) Journal of Literary & Cultural Disability Studies, 4.2: 163-178. 
 “Disabling Sex: Notes for a Crip Theory of Sexuality”. (2011) GLQ: A Journal of Lesbian and Gay Studies 17.1: 107-117.
 Sex and Disability. (2012, co-edited with Anna Mollow) Duke University Press..
 Crip Times: Disability, Globalization, and Resistance. (2018) New York University Press.

See also
Michael Bérubé
Disability Studies
Identity Politics
Judith Butler
Michel Foucault
Queer Theory
Crip (disability term)

References

1966 births
American male non-fiction writers
American non-fiction writers
Disability studies academics
George Washington University faculty
LGBT studies academics
Living people
University of Illinois alumni